The football (soccer) Campeonato Brasileiro Série C 2003, the third level of Brazilian National League, was played from September 17 to December 7, 2003. The competition had 95 clubs and two of them were promoted to Série B.

Ituano finished the final phase group with most points and was declared 2003 Brazilian Série C champions, claiming the promotion to the 2004 Série B along with Santo André, the runners-up.

Stages of the competition

First stage
Group 1 (AC-AM-RO)

Group 2 (AP-PA-RO)

Group 3 (MA)

Group 4 (MA)

Group 5 (MA-PI)

Group 6 (CE)

Group 7 (PB-RN)

Group 8 (AL-PB-PE)

Group 9 (AL-PB)

Group 10 (AL-BA-SE)

Group 11 (BA-SE)

Group 12 (MS)

Group 13 (MT-MS)

Group 14 (GO-TO)

Group 15 (DF-GO)

Group 16 (MG-SP)

Group 17 (MG-SP)

Group 18 (ES-MG)

Group 19 (ES-MG-RJ)

Group 20 (RJ)

Group 21 (RJ)

Group 22 (RJ-SP)

Group 23 (SP)

Group 24 (SP)

Group 25 (SP)

Group 26 (PR-SP)

Group 27 (RS-SC)

Group 28 (RS)

Second stage

[

Third stage

Fourth stage

Fifth stage

Final stage

References

Sources
 rsssf.com

2003 in Brazilian football leagues
Campeonato Brasileiro Série C seasons